Uğur Erdoğan (born January 1, 1987 in İstanbul, Turkey), is a Turkish footballer who currently plays as a midfielder for Tekirdağspor. He has been trained by the Galatasaray S.K. PAF youth department.

External links

1987 births
Footballers from Istanbul
Living people
Galatasaray S.K. footballers
Zeytinburnuspor footballers
Beylerbeyi S.K. footballers
İstanbulspor footballers
Orduspor footballers
Denizlispor footballers
Turkish footballers
Turkey under-21 international footballers
Süper Lig players
Yeni Malatyaspor footballers
Association football defenders